= CYP305 family =

Cytochrome P450, family 305, also known as CYP305, is an animal cytochrome P450 family found in insect genome. The first gene identified in this family is the CYP305A1 from the Drosophila melanogaster (Fruit fly).
